Mike & Molly is an American television sitcom created by Mark Roberts.  Billy Gardell and Melissa McCarthy star as the two title characters, who begin to date after meeting at an Overeaters Anonymous group. The series premiered on CBS on September 20, 2010.  Roberts and Chuck Lorre serve as executive producers. On March 12, 2015, CBS renewed Mike & Molly for a sixth and final season, which premiered on January 6, 2016.

Series overview

Episodes

Season 1 (2010–11)

Season 2 (2011–12)

Season 3 (2012–13)

Season 4 (2013–14)

Season 5 (2014–15)

Season 6 (2016)

References

External links 
 
 List of Mike & Molly episodes at MSN TV
 List of Mike & Molly episodes at The Futon Critic

Lists of American sitcom episodes
Mike & Molly